Events from the year 2000 in Scotland.

Incumbents 

First Minister and Keeper of the Great Seal – Donald Dewar (until 11 October 2000), Henry McLeish (from 27 October 2000)
 Secretary of State for Scotland – John Reid

Law officers 
 Lord Advocate –Lord Hardie; then Lord Boyd of Duncansby
 Solicitor General for Scotland – Colin Boyd; then Neil Davidson
 Advocate General for Scotland – Lynda Clark

Judiciary 
 Lord President of the Court of Session and Lord Justice General – Lord Rodger of Earlsferry
 Lord Justice Clerk – Lord Cullen
 Chairman of the Scottish Land Court – Lord McGhie

Events 
 11 January – a Scottish trawler, the Solway Harvester, sinks in the Irish Sea, killing seven crew.
 26 January – a tribunal grants the release of a school playground killer, Barbara Glover, who was ordered to be detained without limit of time for the 1991 murder of Diane Watson.
 11 February – the Royal Bank of Scotland succeeds in the hostile takeover battle for its larger English rival, NatWest Bank, successfully defeating a rival offer by the Bank of Scotland.
 7 April – the Union Canal reopens for leisure purposes from Linlithgow to Hermiston.
 29 April – at Murrayfield Stadium, the 2000 Challenge Cup tournament culminates in the Bradford Bulls' 24 – 18 win in the final against the Leeds Rhinos.
 May – the Scottish Parliament meets during this month in the former Strathclyde Regional Council debating chamber in Glasgow.
 3 May – the Pan Am Flight 103 bombing trial opens at the Scottish Court in the Netherlands.
 9 June – the Abolition of Feudal Tenure etc. (Scotland) Act 2000 receives Royal Assent.
 21 June – repeal of controversial Section 2B of the Local Government Act 1988 which prevented local authorities from "promoting homosexuality".
 18 July – Alex Salmond resigns as the Leader of the Scottish National Party.
 4 August – Queen Elizabeth The Queen Mother celebrates her 100th birthday in London.
 10 August – 14 August – The first Commonwealth Youth Games take place in Edinburgh.
 23 September – John Swinney wins the Scottish National Party leadership election, succeeding Alex Salmond as Leader of the Scottish National Party and becomes the second Leader of the Opposition.
 26–27 October – Following the death of Donald Dewar, Henry McLeish is selected to be First Minister of Scotland by the Scottish Parliament, and is officially appointed by The Queen.
 21 November – Dennis Canavan MSP resigns as MP for Falkirk West, triggering a by-election.
 23 November – double by-election held in Glasgow Anniesland to elect successors to Donald Dewar's seats in both the UK Parliament and the Scottish Parliament. Labour holds both seats with swings to the SNP of 6% and 7%.
 18 December – it is announced that Inverness has been awarded city status.
 21 December – Falkirk West by-election results in Eric Joyce retaining the UK parliament seat for Labour, though with a majority reduced to just 705 votes in the face of a swing of 16.2% to the SNP.
 22 December – American pop singer Madonna marries English-born film director Guy Ritchie at Skibo Castle, their son Rocco having been christened at Dornoch Cathedral the previous day.
 Islay LIMPET, the world's first commercial wave power device, is built.
 Sue Lawrence publishes Scots Cooking.

Births
 5 March – Jack Aitchison, footballer

Deaths 
 2 February – Mary Docherty, Communist activist (born 1908)
 4 March – Hermann Brück, astronomer (born 1905 in Germany)
 1 April – Alexander Mackenzie Stuart, Baron Mackenzie-Stuart, Scottish lawyer and judge (born 1924)
 27 May – Murray MacLehose, Baron MacLehose of Beoch, Governor of Hong Kong (born 1917)
 11 October – Donald Dewar, politician, First Minister of Scotland (born 1937)
 23 December – Jimmy Shand, accordionist and bandleader (born 1908)

The arts
 27 February – comedy drama television series Monarch of the Glen debuts on BBC One nationally.
 22 March – radio situation comedy series Millport, written by and starring Lynn Ferguson, debuts on BBC Radio 4 nationally.
 James Robertson's novel The Fanatic is published.

See also 
 2000 in England
 2000 in Northern Ireland
 2000 in Wales

References 

 
2000s in Scotland